Riverside is the name of several communities in the U.S. state of West Virginia.

 Riverside, Jefferson County, West Virginia, an unincorporated community
 Riverside, Kanawha County, West Virginia, an unincorporated community
 Riverside, Ritchie County, West Virginia, an unincorporated community
 Riverside, Wood County, West Virginia, an unincorporated community